The Tricasses were a Gallic tribe dwelling on the upper Seine and the Aube rivers during the Roman period. Until the first century AD, they were probably reckoned among the Senones.

Name 
They are mentioned as Tricasses by Pliny (1st c. AD), and as Trikásioi (Τρικάσιοι) by Ptolemy (2nd c. AD).

The Gaulish ethnonym Tricasses derives from the root for 'three', tri-. The meaning of the second element -casses, attested in other Gaulish ethnonyms such as Bodiocasses, Durocasses, Sucasses, Veliocasses or Viducasses, has been debated, but it probably signifies '(curly) hair, hairstyle' (cf. Old Irish chass 'curl'), perhaps referring to a particular warrior coiffure. The name Tricasses may thus be translated as 'the three-braided ones' or 'those of the three (many) curls'.

The city of Troyes, attested ca. 400 AD as civitas Tricassium ('civitas of the Tricasses'; Trecassis in the 7th c., Treci in 890, Troies in 1230), is named after the Gallic tribe.

Geography 
The Tricasses dwelled near the Senones, the Parisii, the Meldi, the Remi and the Lingones.

From the reign of Augustus, Augustobona Tricassium (modern Troyes) was the chief town of their civitas.

References

Bibliography 

 

 

Historical Celtic peoples
Gauls
Tribes of pre-Roman Gaul
Troyes